Steelrising is an action role-playing video game developed by Spiders and published by Nacon. The game was released for Windows PC, PlayStation 5, and Xbox Series X and Series S in September 2022.

Gameplay
Steelrising is an action role-playing video game played from a third-person perspective. As the player progresses in the game and defeat enemies, they will collect Anima Essence, which can be used to upgrade the player's weapons and skills, though upgrading the character can only be done at "Vestal" checkpoints found throughout the world. The Vestal checkpoints also allow the player character to rest to replenish their health. Players are encouraged to play aggressively in the game, as stamina refills instantly after a brief cooldown. The game features an "Assist mode", which allows players to manually adjust various factors of gameplay in order to lower the game's difficulty.

Story
In an alternate version of French Revolution, King Louis XVI had created an army of clockwork automatons and ruled the city of Paris with fear.

Development
The game was developed by French studio Spiders, which previously released titles including The Technomancer and GreedFall. According to CEO and lead writer Jehanne Rousseau, the gameplay of Steelrising was heavily inspired by the Soulsborne games. Publisher Nacon officially announced the game in July 2021. The game was originally set to be released in June 2022, though it was subsequently delayed to September the same year.

Reception

According to review aggregator Metacritic, the game received "mixed or average" reviews.

References

External links
 

2022 video games
Video games developed in France
Video games set in Paris
Video games set in the 18th century
French Revolution video games
Alternate history video games
Windows games
PlayStation 5 games
Xbox Series X and Series S games
Action role-playing video games
Nacon games
Spiders (company) games